Callichroma cyanomelas is a species of beetle in the family Cerambycidae. It was described by White in 1853. It is known from Mexico and Panama.

References

Callichromatini
Beetles described in 1853